The R531 is a Regional Route in South Africa.

Route
Its north-western terminus is the R527 midway between it western origin and the town of Hoedspruit in Limpopo. From there it heads south-east meeting the R40 at a staggered intersection at the village of Klaserie.  It continues east and becomes the northern border between Limpopo and Mpumalanga. On the northern side of the road is Timbavati Game Reserve and on the southern Manyeleti. It ends at the Orpen Gate of the Kruger National Park.

References

Regional Routes in Limpopo